Arivaca artella is a species of snout moth. It is found in the US states of Arizona and New Mexico.

References

Moths described in 1968
Anerastiini
Moths of North America